Ousseynou Cissé (born 7 April 1991) is a professional footballer who plays for National League club Eastleigh. Born in France, he represents Mali internationally.   

Mainly a defensive midfielder, he can also play as a central defender.

Early life
Cissé was born in Suresnes, France to a Malian father and a Senegalese mother.

Club career

Amiens
Cissé joined Amiens' youth academy in 2007 aged 16, after a spell with Paris Saint-Germain. He made his senior debuts in 2009, appearing with the side in Championnat National.

On 5 August 2011 Cissé played his first match as a professional, starting in a 0–1 away loss against Stade de Reims for the Ligue 2 championship. He appeared in 19 matches during the campaign, as his side was relegated as dead last.

Dijon
On 19 July 2012, Cissé signed a two-year deal with Dijon, also in the second division. On 7 March 2014 he scored his first professional goal, scoring the second in a 2–2 draw with AJ Auxerre.

Rayo Vallecano
On 4 July 2015 Cissé moved abroad for the first time in his career, after agreeing to a three-year contract with La Liga side Rayo Vallecano. Following limited first team opportunities, Cissé joined Belgian side Waasland-Beveren in January 2016 on loan until the end of the 2015–16 season,
making twelve appearances for the club and scoring once.

Tours
On 15 July 2016, after reaching an agreement with Rayo Vallecano to terminate his contract, Cissé joined Ligue 2 club Tours FC. Over the following season, Cissé made a total of 26 appearances in all competitions, and scoring once before being released by the club.

Milton Keynes Dons
On 29 June 2017, Cissé joined English League One club Milton Keynes Dons on a two-year deal. On 6 January 2018, Cissé scored his first goal for the club, the winning goal in a 0–1, third round FA Cup victory over Queens Park Rangers. On 11 August 2018, Cissé scored his first league goal, a 90th-minute winner, in a 1–0 home victory over Bury. After two seasons in which he made 68 appearances in all competitions and scored 3 goals, Cissé announced on 11 May 2019 he would be leaving the club at the end of the 2018–19 season.

Gillingham
On 24 June 2019, Cissé joined League One club Gillingham on a free transfer effective from 1 July 2019. He made his debut for the club in their opening fixture of the 2019–20 season, a 1–1 draw away to Doncaster Rovers. He scored his first and only goal for the club in the next league fixture as they were defeated 1–2 at home to Burton Albion.

He signed for League Two side Leyton Orient on a six-month loan deal on 17 January 2020 and remained with the club until the curtailment of the season due to the Coronavirus outbreak. 

He was released by Gillingham at the conclusion of the 2019–20 season, having only made 5 appearances for the club in all competitions.

Leyton Orient 
On 16 July 2020, Cissé joined Leyton Orient on a permanent basis, signing a two-year contract.

Oldham Athletic 
On 7 August 2021, Cissé departed Leyton Orient by mutual agreement, joining Oldham Athletic on a one-year contract. Oldham confirmed at the end of the season that they would not be offering Cissé a new contract and he would be leaving the club.

Eastleigh
On 27 June 2022, Cissé agreed to join National League club Eastleigh following his departure from Oldham.

International career
Cissé was called up by Mali national team manager Alain Giresse for a friendly against Libya and a 2017 Africa Cup of Nations qualification match against South Sudan. He made his international debut on 6 June 2015, in a 2–2 draw against the former.

Career statistics

Club

International

Honours
Amiens
Championnat National runner-up: 2010–11

Milton Keynes Dons
EFL League Two third-place promotion: 2018–19

References

External links

1991 births
Living people
Sportspeople from Suresnes
Footballers from Hauts-de-Seine
French footballers
Citizens of Mali through descent
Malian footballers
Mali international footballers
Association football defenders
Association football midfielders
Amiens SC players
Dijon FCO players
Tours FC players
Rayo Vallecano players
S.K. Beveren players
Milton Keynes Dons F.C. players
Gillingham F.C. players
Leyton Orient F.C. players
Oldham Athletic A.F.C. players
Eastleigh F.C. players
Ligue 2 players
Championnat National players
Belgian Pro League players
English Football League players
French expatriate footballers
Malian expatriate footballers
Expatriate footballers in England
Expatriate footballers in Spain
French expatriate sportspeople in England
French expatriate sportspeople in Spain
Malian expatriate sportspeople in England
Malian expatriate sportspeople in Spain
French sportspeople of Malian descent
French sportspeople of Senegalese descent